"Tiptoe" is a song written and recorded by American rock band Imagine Dragons, for their debut studio album Night Visions. The song appears as the second track on the album.

Bubbling under the Billboard Hot 100 at number 13, it also peaked at number 34 on the Billboard Rock songs chart. The group performed the song at the 2014 Billboard Music Awards.

Composition
The theme of the song deals with the speaker's victory over something momentous, despite him not being noticed or recognized by others.  The intro to the song is entirely guitar parts that mimic synthesizer parts. It is composed in the key of Bb minor.

Charts

Weekly charts

Year-end charts

Certifications

References

2012 songs
Songs written by Wayne Sermon
Songs written by Dan Reynolds (musician)
Songs written by Daniel Platzman
Songs written by Ben McKee
Imagine Dragons songs
Song recordings produced by Alex da Kid